This list of museums in Northumberland, England contains museums which are defined for this context as institutions (including nonprofit organizations, government entities, and private businesses) that collect and care for objects of cultural, artistic, scientific, or historical interest and make their collections or related exhibits available for public viewing. Also included are non-profit art galleries and university art galleries.  Museums that exist only in cyberspace (i.e., virtual museums) are not included.

Museums

Defunct museums
 Dilston Castle, Corbridge, no longer open to the public
 Norham Station Museum, Norham, closed in 2010, listed for sale in 2013

See also
 :Category:Tourist attractions in Northumberland

References

 Northumberland County Council: Museums and Galleries

 
Northumberland
Museums